Mayna Treanor Avent (1868 — 1959) was an American painter.

Early life
Mayna Treanor Avent was born on September 17, 1868, in Nashville, Tennessee.

Her father was Thomas O. Treanor and her mother, Mary Andrews Treanor. She grew up at Tulip Grove, an antebellum mansion opposite Andrew Jackson's The Hermitage. She studied painting at the Cincinnati Art Academy in Cincinnati, Ohio and at the Académie Julian in Paris, France for two years.

Career

Avent taught painting in Nashville, and exhibited her oil and watercolour paintings in Massachusetts, South Carolina and Tennessee. She often painted in what is now known as the Mayna Treanor Avent Studio on the Jake's Creek Trail in the Great Smoky Mountains National Park near Elkmont, Tennessee.

Avent was a member of the Nashville Studio Club, the Nashville Artists Guild, and the Centennial Club.

Personal life and Death
In 1891, she married Frank Avent, a lawyer for the State Railroad Commissioner from Murfreesboro, Tennessee. They had a son, James Avent (1895–1995). Avent spent her last three years with her son in Sewanee, Tennessee. She died on January 2, 1959.

External links 

 Information archive about the Cabin Studio and the Artist

References

1868 births
1959 deaths
People from Nashville, Tennessee
Académie Julian alumni
19th-century American painters
20th-century American painters
American expatriates in France